The Piz Popena is a mountain in the Dolomites of Auronzo and Misurina, located in Veneto (province of Belluno).

Geography 
The mountain is located north of Passo Tre Croci, east of Mount Cristallo, and west of Misurina.

References

Notes 

Mountains of Veneto
Mountains of the Alps
Alpine three-thousanders
Dolomites
Geography of Cortina d'Ampezzo